Feliniopsis is a genus of moths of the family Noctuidae.

Species
 Feliniopsis africana Schaus, 1893
 Feliniopsis albilineata (Warren, 1912)
 Feliniopsis albiorbis (Warren, 1912)
 Feliniopsis annosa Viette, 1963
 Feliniopsis annosa annosa Viette, 1963
 Feliniopsis annosa anuosoides Hacker & Fibiger, 2007
 Feliniopsis asahinai (Sugi, 1982)
 Feliniopsis baueri Hacker & Fibiger, 2007
 Feliniopsis berioi Viette, 1963
 Feliniopsis breviuscula (Walker, 1858)
 Feliniopsis confundens (Walker, 1857)
 Feliniopsis confusa Laporte, 1973
 Feliniopsis connivens Felder & Rogenhofer, 1874
 Feliniopsis connivens connivens Felder & Rogenhofer, 1874
 Feliniopsis connivens felix Hacker & Fibiger, 2007
 Feliniopsis connotata (Warren, 1912)
 Feliniopsis consummata Walker, 1857
 Feliniopsis consummata consummata Walker, 1857
 Feliniopsis consummata tulipifera Saalmüller, 1891
 Feliniopsis dargei (Laporte, 1973)
 Feliniopsis dinavana (Hampson, 1908)
 Feliniopsis discisignata (Wileman & South, 1920)
 Feliniopsis distans (Moore, 1882)
 Feliniopsis duponti Laporte, 1974
 Feliniopsis duponti dargei Laporte, 1973
 Feliniopsis duponti duponti Laporte, 1974
 Feliniopsis germaine (Laporte, 1975)
 Feliniopsis grisea Laporte, 1973
 Feliniopsis gueneei Laporte, 1973
 Feliniopsis hoplista Viette, 1963
 Feliniopsis hosplitoides Laporte, 1979
 Feliniopsis hosplitoides aarviki Hacker & Fibiger, 2007
 Feliniopsis hosplitoides hosplitoides Laporte, 1979
 Feliniopsis hyperythra Galsworthy, 1997
 Feliniopsis hyposcota (Hampson, 1911)
 Feliniopsis incerta Roepke, 1938
 Feliniopsis indigna Herrich-Schäffer, 1854
 Feliniopsis indistans Guenée, 1852
 Feliniopsis inextricans (Walker, 1858)
 Feliniopsis insolita Hacker & Fibiger, 2007
 Feliniopsis ivoriensis Laporte, 1973
 Feliniopsis karischi Hacker & Fibiger, 2007
 Feliniopsis kipengerensis Hacker & Fibiger, 2007
 Feliniopsis kobesi Hacker & Fibiger, 2007
 Feliniopsis knudlarseni Hacker & Fibiger, 2007
 Feliniopsis kuehnei Hacker & Fibiger, 2007
 Feliniopsis laportei Hacker & Fibiger, 2007
 Feliniopsis laportei dallastai Hacker & Fibiger, 2007
 Feliniopsis laportei laportei Hacker & Fibiger, 2007
 Feliniopsis legraini Hacker & Fibiger, 2007
 Feliniopsis leucostigma (Moore, 1867)
 Feliniopsis ligniensis Laporte, 1973
 Feliniopsis lucipara (Wileman & West, 1929)
 Feliniopsis macrostigma (Snellen, 1880)
 Feliniopsis medleri Laporte, 1973
 Feliniopsis milloti Viette, 1961
 Feliniopsis minnecii Berio, 1939
 Feliniopsis nabalua (Holloway, 1976)
 Feliniopsis nigribarbata Hampson, 1908
 Feliniopsis niveipuncta (Hampson, 1911)
 Feliniopsis opposita (Walker, 1865)
 Feliniopsis parvula Hacker & Fibiger, 2007
 Feliniopsis peridela (Wileman & West, 1929)
 Feliniopsis politzari Hacker & Fibiger, 2007
 Feliniopsis quadrispina (Holloway, 1979)
 Feliniopsis rufigiji Hacker & Fibiger, 2007
 Feliniopsis sabaea Hacker & Fibiger, 2001
 Feliniopsis satellitis Berio, 1974
 Feliniopsis securifera (Wileman & West, 1929)
 Feliniopsis segreta Berio, 1966
 Feliniopsis septentrionalis (Rougeot & Laporte, 1983)
 Feliniopsis siderifera (Moore, 1881)
 Feliniopsis somaliensis (Laporte, 1974)
 Feliniopsis subsagula D. S. Fletcher, 1961
 Feliniopsis talhouki Wiltshire, 1983
 Feliniopsis tamsi (Berio, 1974)
 Feliniopsis tenera Viette, 1963
 Feliniopsis theryi (Laporte, 1975)
 Feliniopsis thoracica (Walker, 1858)
 Feliniopsis tripunctata (Chang, 1991)
 Feliniopsis tulipifera (Saalmüller, 1891)
 Feliniopsis viettei Hacker & Fibiger, 2001
 Feliniopsis wojtusiaki Hacker & Fibiger, 2007

References

 Berio (1966). Annali del Museo civico di storia naturale Giacomo Doria 76: 216, fig. 5.
 Berio (1974). Annali del Museo civico di storia naturale Giacomo Doria 80: 218, fig. 3.
 Fletcher (1961). Ruwenzori Expedition 1(7): 199, fig. 32.
 Hacker, H.H. & Fibiger, M. (2001). Esperiana Buchreihe zur Entomologie 8: 594, pl. 29, fig. 11 & 13.
 Hacker, H.H. & Fibiger, M. (2007). Esperiana Buchreihe zur Entomologie 3: 59-178.
 Hampson, G.F. et al. (1892-1937). Fauna of British India, Including Ceylon and Burma: Moths
 Hampson (1908). Catalogue of the Lepidoptera Phalaenae in the British Museum 7: 129, text fig. 28.
 Herrich-Schäffer (1854). Sammlung neuer oder wenig bekannter aussereuropäischer Schmetterlinge pl. 27, fig. 130.
 Laporte (1973). Bulletin du Muséum national d'histoire naturelle ser. 3, Zool. 126: 1487–1491.
 Laporte (1973b). Bulletin de la Société entomologique de France 78: 63–64.
 Laporte (1974). Bulletin mensuel de la Société linnéenne de Lyon 43: 250, fig. 15.
 Laporte (1979). Spixiana 2: 108, fig. 4.
 Saalmüller (1891). Lepidopteren von Madagascar p. 321, fig. 195.
 Schaus & Clement (1893). On a Collection of Sierra Leone, Lepidoptera 33, pl. 2, fig. 10.
 Viette (1963). Bulletin de la Société entomologique de France 68: 34–35.
 Walker (1857). List of the Specimens of Lepidopterous Insects in the Collection of the British Museum 11: 591.

Hadeninae